Alexander Macomb   (April 3, 1782 – June 25, 1841) was the Commanding General of the United States Army from May 29, 1828, until his death on June 25, 1841. Macomb was the field commander at the Battle of Plattsburgh during the War of 1812 and, after the stunning victory, was lauded with praise and styled "The Hero of Plattsburgh" by some of the American press. He was promoted to Major General for his conduct, receiving both the Thanks of Congress and a Congressional Gold Medal.

Early life
Born at British-held Detroit in 1782, Macomb was the son of Alexander Macomb, a merchant and fur trader from upstate New York, and Mary Catherine Navarre, she of ethnic French descent.

He moved with his parents to New York City, where his father gained wealth as a land speculator, particularly in the millions of acres of New York land released by the federal government for sale after the Iroquois nations had been largely forced from the state into exile in Ontario following British defeat in the American Revolutionary War. The son received a classical education at Newark Academy in New Jersey.

Early career
In 1798, at the age of 16, Macomb joined a New York militia company. In January 1799, with the recommendation of Alexander Hamilton, he was commissioned a Cornet in the Regular Army during the French emergency. In March he was promoted to second lieutenant, and he was honorably discharged in June 1800.

In February 1801, he was commissioned a second lieutenant, 2d Infantry, serving as secretary to a commission that treated with the Indians of the Southeast.

He was commissioned a first lieutenant in the Army Corps of Engineers, which was established in 1802 at West Point to constitute a military academy. He was one of the first officers to receive formal training there.

For five years, Macomb directed construction of coastal fortifications in the Carolinas and Georgia. He also established fortifications at Fort Gratiot, Michigan, Chicago, Mackinaw, Prairie du Chien, St. Peter's, and St. Mary's in what was considered the Northwest area - Michigan and Illinois.

At the beginning of the War of 1812, in July 1812 Macomb was promoted at the age of 30 to colonel of the newly organised 3rd Artillery Regiment.

He was in command of the Sacketts Harbor garrison.  Under Winfield Scott, he took part in the Capture of Fort George.  He was part of James Wilkinson's failed St. Lawrence expedition.

Command at the Battle of Plattsburgh
He won acclaim during the War of 1812 as brigadier general in command of the Right Division of the Northern Army, responsible for defending the frontier of northern New York. At the Battle of Plattsburgh on September 11, 1814, with only 1,500 regular troops and some detachments of militia, he was opposed by a British force of 10,531 men under Lieutenant General Sir George Prevost. Macomb's heavily outnumbered troops fell back before the British columns in a series of encounters as Prevost advanced towards the American defensive works.

In the weeks leading up to the battle, Macomb, knowing full well he would be greatly outnumbered, worked with his men to move trees and create fake roads; in order to obscure the genuine roads and lead the British into dead-end traps far from the three nearby American forts (a maneuver Macomb called abattis). The British attack was diffused by these efforts. The long narrow lines of marching soldiers were unable to easily stop and about-face. They became entangled in the narrow false road maze, where they became targets for American ambush.

The British were about to launch an assault on the American defenses when the news came through of the defeat of the British naval squadron on Lake Champlain. Prevost needed the British Lake Champlain squadron to supply his planned advance into Vermont. Without it, he had no choice but to abandon the expedition. The British invaders returned to Canada.

Macomb was showered with praise and styled "the Hero of Plattsburgh" by some in the American press. He was promoted to major general for his conduct at this battle, and received the formal thanks of Congress and a Congressional Gold Medal.

Commanding General of the United States Army
When Major General Jacob Brown, the Army's commanding general, died in February 1828, Macomb was the senior brigadier general on the Army register, although, as the Army's chief of engineers, he was paid only at the rank of a colonel. President John Quincy Adams promoted him to commanding general of the Army with the rank of major general. The Army's two serving brigadier generals — Winfield Scott and Edmund P. Gaines — had been vying for the position. Their quarrels over seniority had scandalized the Army and Adams bypassed them to offer the post to Macomb.

The general's last active service in a theater of war was in the Seminole War in Florida, in 1835.

Macomb's tenure as Commanding General was marked by "continuing uncertainty about the responsibilities and authority of his position. To secure his seniority over Scott and Gaines, both two-star brevet major generals, Macomb added a provision in the 1834 regulations that 'the insignia of the major general commanding in chief should be three stars.' In the same document he sought to define his relationship to the Secretary of War and establish his primacy over the bureau chiefs, including his successor as Chief of Engineers. This was easier said than done. Most issues were not fully resolved until early the next century."

He advocated doubling Army strength, increasing enlisted pay, providing relief for some widows and orphans, and regularizing the officer retirement and replacement system. In 1840 the Army Corps of Engineers adopted the castle uniform insignia and first described the Corps of Engineers' distinctive Essayons button (Motto in French, meaning: "Let us try").

Macomb was succeeded by Major General Winfield Scott, who had worked "hard at mending fences in the intervening 13 years..." within the Army.

Writings and other works
In 1809, Macomb was the author of a seminal book (republished in 2006) on martial law and the conduct of courts-martial. It was the first book written on American procedures. During this period he was serving as a judge-advocate general (JAG) in the Army. He published a revised, updated book solely on courts martial in 1809.

He also wrote a play on the siege of Detroit by Ottawa chief Pontiac. It features Macomb's maternal grandfather, Robert Navarre, who helped defend the settlement. See Published Works and Further Reading, infra.

In addition, Macomb is recognized as an artist. His painting Detroit as Seen from the Canadian Shore in 1821, a watercolor and pencil work, is held by the Detroit Institute of Arts.

Engineers as commanding generals
Macomb was the first of five Commanding Generals (Chiefs of Staff after the 1903 reorganization) who had held Engineer commissions early in their careers. All had transferred to other branches before being appointed to this top position. The others were George B. McClellan, Henry W. Halleck, Douglas MacArthur, and Maxwell D. Taylor.

Congressional Gold Medal
Following the Battle of Plattsburgh and the end of the War of 1812, a Congressional Gold Medal honoring Alexander Macomb and his men was struck by Act of Congress (3 Stat. 247), to wit:

Resolved, That the thanks of Congress be, and they are hereby presented to Major General Macomb, and, through him, to the officers and men of the regular army under his command, and to the militia and volunteers of New York and Vermont, for their gallantry and good conduct, in defeating the enemy at Plattsburg (sic) on the eleventh of September; repelling, with one thousand five hundred men, aided by a body of militia and volunteers from New York and Vermont, a British veteran army, greatly superior in number, and that the President of the United States be requested to cause a gold medal to be struck, emblematic of this triumph, and presented to Major General Macomb. – Resolution of Congress November 3. 1814.

Obverse: MAJOR GENERAL ALEXANDER MACOMB. Bust of Gen. Macomb, in uniform, facing the right FÜRST. F(ecit). indicates the engraver Moritz Fuerst (1782–1840), who designed several medals of 1812 heroes for the Philadelphia mint. The bust of Macomb found on the Congressional Medal, however, is reminiscent of the 1809 portrait of Macomb by Saint-Mémin (1770–1852), in which Macomb is wearing the undressed coat of blue with black velvet collar and cuffs typical of an Engineering officer.

Reverse: RESOLUTION OF CONGRESS NOVEMBER 3. 1814. The American army repulsing the British troops, who are striving to cross the Saranac river. To the left, Plattsburgh in flames; to the right, naval battle on Lake Champlain; in the distance, Cumberland Head. Exergue: BATTLE OF PLATTSBURGH September 11. 1814. FÜRST. F(ecit).

This was one of 27 Gold Medals authorized by Congress arising from the War of 1812.

Historical recognition
Alexander Macomb is recognized by a Michigan Historical Marker installed at the corner of Gratiot Avenue and Macomb Street in Mount Clemens, Michigan, the county seat of Macomb County, named for him. It is Registered Site S0418, erected in 1974. It states:

He is memorialized by several monuments. One statue of Alexander Macomb was sculpted by Adolph Alexander Weinman and erected in 1906 in downtown Detroit, Michigan. This statue was made from melted down cannons, and was a notable and monumental task. Another is in downtown Mount Clemens, Michigan, in front of the Circuit Court building at 40 North Gratiot Avenue. Several others exist.

Macomb died while in office at Washington, D.C. He was originally buried at the Presbyterian Burying Ground, but in 1850 his remains were disinterred and he was reburied at Congressional Cemetery.

His remains, and those of his wife, Catherine, were disinterred again in June 2008 so that the brick-lined burial vault beneath their 6-ton (5,400 kg),  marble monument could be repaired to prevent its impending collapse. During the month it took to make the necessary repairs, the couple's remains were held at the Smithsonian; they were viewed by several of the general's descendants, including his great-great-great granddaughter. After the $24,000 repairs were completed by the Department of Veterans Affairs, their remains were re-interred on July 17, 2008. The monument to Alexander Macomb is "one of the most unusual in the nation."

Societies
During the 1820s, Macomb was a member of the Columbian Institute for the Promotion of Arts and Sciences, who counted among their members former presidents Andrew Jackson and John Quincy Adams and many prominent men of the day, including well-known representatives of the military, government service, medical and other professions.

Legacy and eponymous locations
His youngest son was Commodore William H. Macomb.

  See, List of Liberty ships: M-R.

In addition to the ship, Alexander Macomb has been the source for the name of a number of locations, communities, and institutions around the country, including:
Macomb Township and Macomb County, Michigan
Macomb Community College
Macomb, Illinois
Macomb Mountain (New York), one of the Adirondack High Peaks named in his honor.  There are three variant spellings.
 Village of McComb, Ohio
 The Alexander Macomb Chapter of the Daughters of the American Revolution is situated in Mount Clemens, Michigan, and was founded in June, 1899.
 Macomb Street. A street named after the general in the City of Plattsburgh.
 Macomb Street. A street named after the general in Washington, District of Columbia.
 Macomb Hall, a dormitory on the Plattsburgh State college campus, several miles from the shore of Lake Champlain.
 Alexander Macomb Academy School and the Alexander Macomb Early Learning Center are located in Mount Clemens, Michigan.
 Macomb Reservation State Park

An elementary school named after him in Detroit opened in 1929 and closed in 2009.
Macomb Street, A street named after the general in Monroe, Michigan.

Published works
Macomb, Alexander, A Treatise on Martial Law, and Courts-Martial; as Practiced in the United States. (Charleston: J. Hoff, 1809), republished (New York: Lawbook Exchange, June 2007), 340 pages.
Macomb, Alexander, Pontiac: or The Siege of Detroit. A drama, in three acts, (Boston: Samuel Colman, 1835), edited (Marshall Davies Lloyd, February 2000) 60 pages.
Macomb, Alexander, Major General of the United States Army,  The Practice of Courts Martial, (New York: Harper & Brothers, 1841) 154 pages.
See Samuel Cooper infra.

Dates of rank
 
Macomb's effective dates of rank were:
Cornet, Light Dragoons – January 10, 1799
2nd Lieutenant, Light Dragoons – March 2, 1799
Honorably discharged – June 15, 1800
2nd Lieutenant, 2nd Infantry – February 16, 1801
1st Lieutenant, Engineers – October 12, 1802
Captain, Engineers – June 11, 1801
Major, Engineers – February 23, 1808
Lieutenant Colonel, Engineers – July 23, 1810
Colonel, 3d Artillery – July 6, 1812
Brigadier General – January 24, 1814
Brevet Major General – September 11, 1814
Colonel, Chief Engineer – June 1, 1821
Major General – May 24, 1828

See also
List of books about the War of 1812

Notes

References

Sources

Further reading
 Bell, William Gardner, Commanding Generals and Chiefs of Staff, 1775–2005: Portraits & Biographical Sketches of the United States Army's Senior Officer (Washington, D.C.: Center of Military History, U.S. Army, 2006). .
 Brown, John Howard, The Cyclopaedia of American Biography: Comprising the Men and Women of the United States Who Have Been Identified with the Growth of the Nation V5 (Published by Kessinger Publishing, 2006) 700 pages, Alexander Macomb, p. 305. , .
 Cooper, Samuel. "The History of the Infantry Drill Regulations of the United States Army", A Concise System of Instructions and Regulations for the Militia and Volunteers of the United States.... Prepared and Arranged by Brevet Captain S. Cooper, Aide-de-camp and Assistant Adjutant General. Under the Supervision of Major General Alexander Macomb, Commanding the Army of the United States. (Philadelphia: Robert P. Desilver, 1836).  At Open Library.
 Everest, Allan Seymour, The military career of Alexander Macomb and Macomb at Plattsburgh 1814, (Plattsburgh, New York: Clinton County Historical Association, 1989.), 85 pp.
 Farmer, Silas. (1884) (Jul 1969) The history of Detroit and Michigan, or, The metropolis illustrated: a chronological cyclopaedia of the past and present: including a full record of territorial days in Michigan, and the annuals of Wayne County.
 Fitz-Enz, David G. (2001) The Final Invasion: Plattsburgh, the War of 1812's Most Decisive Battle (New York: Cooper Square Press) pp xx, 269.  .
 Hickey, Donald R. (1990) The War of 1812: The Forgotten Conflict Urbana, Illinois: University of Illinois Press. National Historical Society Book Prize and American Military Institute Best Book Award.  ; .
 Hickey, Donald R. (2006) Don't Give Up the Ship! Myths of the War of 1812. (Urbana: University of Illinois Press) .
 Jenkins, John S. (1856) "Alexander Macomb". In Daring Deeds of American Generals, (New York: A. A. Kelley, Publisher) pp. 295–322. 
 
 Millard, James P. Bibliography and sources on the Battle of Plattsburgh.
 Peterson, Charles J., Military Heroes of the War of 1812 (10th ed.). (Philadelphia, Pa.: James B. Smith & Co.,1852).
 Richards, George H., Memoir of Alexander Macomb (New York: M'Elrath, Bangs & Co., 1833).
 Roosevelt, Theodore. The Naval War of 1812 Or the History of the United States Navy during the Last War with Great Britain to Which Is Appended an Account of the Battle of New Orleans (1882) (New York: The Modern Library, 1999).

External links

 Army Corps of Engineers, Office of History
 Battle of Plattsburgh Association.
 "Defense of Plattsburgh" painting by Lee Hunt, 1992 (Interactive).
 
 Google maps, Battles of Lake Champlain and of Plattsburgh.
 Macomb Family
 Millard, James, America's Historic Lakes, links, documents, and sources.
 Overview of the Battle of Plattsburgh.
 Transcript of Alexander Macomb letter on defense of Fort Moreau.
 Transcript of Alexander Macomb letter on British retreat from Plattsburg.

1782 births
1841 deaths
Military personnel from Detroit
Adjutants general of the United States Army
United States Army generals
United States Army personnel of the War of 1812
Congressional Gold Medal recipients
Burials at the Congressional Cemetery
Burials at Presbyterian Burying Ground
Commanding Generals of the United States Army
American militiamen